Margaret Lawrence may refer to:

Margaret Lawrence (actress) (1889–1929), American actress
Margaret Lawrence (curler), see 1994 Scott Tournament of Hearts
Margaret Morgan Lawrence (1914-2019), American pediatric psychiatrist
Maggie Lawrence, see Candidates of the 1996 Australian federal election

In fiction:
Margaret Lawrence, character in Rising Shore Roanoke
Maggie Lawrence, character in Gloria (TV series)

See also
Margaret Laurence (1926–1987), Canadian author
Margaret Laurence (actress), Australian television actress